"Tarot" is a song by Puerto Rican singers and rappers Bad Bunny and Jhayco from the former's fifth studio album Un Verano Sin Ti (2022), on which it appears as the seventh track. It was released on May 6, 2022, by Rimas Entertainment alongside the rest of the album. The song was written by the performers while its production was handled by Tainy, La Paciencia, Albert Hype and Jota Rosa. This marks the fourth time Bad Bunny and Jhayco collaborated each other, following the remix version of "No Me Conoce", "Cómo Se Siente" and "Dakiti". The song's title refers to the pack of playing cards of the same name.

Critical reception
"Tarot" was ranked by Billboard as the seventh and least best collaboration song from Un Verano Sin Ti. The magazine called it "an infectious EDM track about a girl who's the center of attention. While we would've really appreciated hearing the hitmakers explore new sounds in this album's collab, why deviate from something that's worked for them in the past, right?"

Commercial performance
"Tarot", along with the other twenty-two tracks on Un Verano Sin Ti, charted on the Billboard Hot 100, peaking at number 18. It also performed well on the Billboard Global 200, charting at number 9, and on the US Hot Latin Songs chart, where it peaked at number 7.

Audio visualizer
A 360° audio visualizer for the song was uploaded to YouTube on May 6, 2022, along with the other audio visualizer videos of the songs that appeared on Un Verano Sin Ti.

Charts

Weekly charts

Year-end charts

Certifications

References

External links
 

2022 songs
Bad Bunny songs
Jhayco songs
Songs written by Bad Bunny